Chloroleucon foliolosum is a tree species in the legume family (Fabaceae). It is found in Argentina, Brazil and Bolivia.

Junior synonyms are:

 Calliandra aristulata Rizzini
 Calliandra grisebachianum (Benth.) Speg.
 Feuilleea bahiensis Kuntze
 Pithecellobium foliolosum Benth.
 Pithecellobium grisebachianum Harms
 Pithecellobium myriophyllum Malme
Pithecellobium myriophyllum Gagnep. is a synonym of Albizia lebbekoides
 Pithecellobium oligandrum Rizzini
 Pithecolobium foliolosum Benth. (lapsus)

Footnotes

References
  (2005): Chloroleucon foliolosum. Version 10.01, November 2005. Retrieved 2008-MAR-30.
 

foliolosum
Flora of Argentina
Flora of Bolivia
Taxonomy articles created by Polbot
Taxobox binomials not recognized by IUCN